The 2014 Canadian Soccer League season was the 17th since its establishment where a total of 20 teams from Ontario took part in the league. The season began on May 24, 2014, and concluded on October 26, 2014. York Region Shooters won their second championship in a 5–4 victory in a penalty shootout over Toronto Croatia in the CSL Championship final held at Esther Shiner Stadium in Toronto. York Region became the second club in the league's history to produce a perfect season, and championship after the Toronto Olympians in the 1999 season.

The league's strained relationship with the Canadian Soccer Association continued before the launch of the 2014 season with the CSA expelling the CSL from its membership over alleged violations of rules and regulations in order to make way for a lesser structure in Ontario. After failing to specify which rule violations were made and without providing a formal hearing in order to discuss the issues the CSL in response filed litigation against the CSA. The league operated as a private league for the first time since the 1997 season in its predecessor league the Canadian National Soccer League. Though they did join the newly formed Soccer Federation of Canada, which provides private soccer entities the services needed such as administration of players, non-playing personnel, match officials and insurance.

Once the CSL was de-sanctioned the league decreased in membership to 10 teams in the first division with Windsor Stars joining the newly formed League1 Ontario, while founding member St. Catharines Roma Wolves disbanded their professional team while still operating their youth teams. Meanwhile, the second division increased in size to 10 teams with Milton SC joining along with the addition of Winstars Shooters the reserve team for the York Region Shooters after its affiliation arrangement with the Winstars Soccer Academy. The league formed an working relationship with the American Soccer League in order to assist in areas of competition and business. While its youth development system continued its progress with more than 40 former CSL players being selected for various national teams in the last four seasons. This Week in the CSL the league's weekly television show hosted by producer Alex Bastyovanszky continued covering the CSL with Ethnic Channels Group distributing the program.

First division

Teams 
All of the 10 teams playing in the first division this year are returning from the 2013 season. From the previous year, two teams are not part of the league anymore: Windsor Stars, who will be part of the newly formed League1 Ontario, and St. Catharines Roma Wolves.

Results

Positions by round

Standings

Goal scorers

Updated: April 30, 2017

Playoffs

Bracket

Quarterfinals

Semifinals

CSL Championship

Second division

Standings

Goal scorers

Updated: December 17, 2014
Source: http://canadiansoccerleague.ca/2014-second-division-stats/

Playoffs

Second Division Championship

CSL Executive Committee and Staff 
The 2014 CSL Executive Committee.

Individual awards 
The annual CSL awards ceremony was held on October 25, 2014 in North York, Toronto. After winning the CSL Golden Boot London City's Marin Vučemilović-Grgić received his second MVP award. Burlington SC received the Defender and Goalkeeper of the Year with former Serbian football veterans Vladimir Vujasinović and Nikola Stanojevic chosen as its recipients. Stanojevic was co-recipient with Josip Keran, a former Druga HNL player with Toronto Croatia. Aleksandar Stojiljković, former Serbian SuperLiga player was chosen as the Rookie of the Year.

After making the transition to head coach, and leading York Region Shooters to an undefeated season Darryl Gomez was voted the Coach of the Year. The league's Director for Youth Phil Ionadi was given the Harry Paul Gauss award. Marco Jaramilio was selected by the CSL Referee Committee as the Referee of the Year, and Kingston FC were recognized for their solid discipline on the field of play with the Fair Play and Respect award.

References

2014
Canadian Soccer League
Canadian Soccer League